Jarošov may refer to:
 Jarošov (Svitavy District), a village in the Pardubice Region, Czech Republic
 Jarošov nad Nežárkou, a village in the South Bohemian Region, Czech Republic